Katrinedal (or Djupedalen) is a locality situated in Vänersborg Municipality, Västra Götaland County, Sweden with 270 inhabitants in 2010.

References 

Populated places in Västra Götaland County
Populated places in Vänersborg Municipality
Dalsland